, also titled in French as La Croisée dans un Labyrinthe Étranger, is a Japanese manga series written and illustrated by Hinata Takeda about a young Japanese girl named Yune who finds herself in late-19th century Paris. 

The series was serialized in Fujimi Shobo's Dragon Age Pure and Monthly Dragon Age from June 2006, but remained unfinished due to Takeda's death from an unspecified disease in January 2017. An anime television adaptation by Satelight aired in Japan between July and September 2011.

Plot 
The story takes place at the end of the 19th century, as Japanese culture gains popularity in the West. A young Japanese girl, Yune, accompanies a French traveller, Oscar Claudel, on his journey back to France, and offers to help at the family's ironwork shop in Paris. Oscar's grandson and shop owner Claude reluctantly accepts to take care of Yune, and we learn how those two, who have so little in common, get to understand each other and live together in the Paris of the 1800s.

Characters

A small Japanese girl who comes to France with Oscar in order to work at the Enseignes du Roy.

A worker at the Enseignes du Roy and Oscar's grandson. He is generally unfamiliar with Japanese customs and is often confused by some of Yune's mannerisms.

The owner of Enseignes du Roy and Claude's grandfather who brings Yune home with him to France.

A member of the upper class Blanche family who owns the Galerie du Roy within which Ensignes du Roy is located. She has a fascination with Japanese culture and finds herself particularly attracted to Yune, hoping to one day have her stay at her mansion.

A member of the Blanche family and Alice's older sister. It is implied that she has been in love with Claude since childhood, but due to their class differences they can never be together.

Media

Manga 
The original manga by Hinata Takeda began serialization in Fujimi Shobo's Dragon Age Pure magazine on June 29, 2006, before moving to Monthly Dragon Age from June 9, 2009. Two tankōbon volumes were released between December 8, 2007 and June 9, 2009. The manga remains unfinished due to Takeda's death from an unspecified disease in January 2017.

Anime 
At the end of 2010, Monthly Dragon Ages official website announced that an anime series was underway. The anime series is produced by Satelight and aired in Japan between July 4, 2011 and September 19, 2011. A bonus episode, Episode 4.5, was broadcast on the ShowTime online service on July 29, 2011 and was released on the third Blu-ray and DVD volume released on November 25, 2011. North American licensor Sentai Filmworks simulcast the series on The Anime Network and released it on subtitled DVD in September 2012.

Episode list

Reception 
Theron Martin of Anime News Network noted that the series didn't utilize its expansive location as much and found its dramatic moments more forced than touching. But Martin praised the series for Satelight's detailed animation, the teaching of cultural exchange in its episodes and its charming and endearing cast, saying that: "It is a cute, relaxing, and occasionally very funny view, however, one stress-free enough to make a soothing way to wind down a difficult day." Tim Jones of THEM Anime Reviews also criticized the story's forced conflict and lack of new locations but gave praise to the animation and score for capturing 19th century France and Yune's adventures through that period, concluding that: "It's a good series, though its cute heroine and sweet slice-of-life moments are hampered by drama that seems overused more than it should."

References

Similar Programs
 Moero! Top Striker : Same as this work, an animation with the theme of "life in a foreign country". Broadcast in 1991-1992.
 Kin-iro Mosaic : An anime about a British girl who stays in Japan

External links 
 

2011 Japanese television series debuts
2011 anime television series debuts
Television shows set in Paris
Fujimi Shobo manga
Kadokawa Dwango franchises
Satelight
Sentai Filmworks
Shōnen manga